Searcy Branch is a stream in Clay County in the U.S. state of Missouri.

Searcy Branch was named after the local Searcy family.

See also
List of rivers of Missouri

References

Rivers of Clay County, Missouri
Rivers of Missouri